Providence is an unincorporated community in Union Township, Johnson County, Indiana.

History
Providence was originally called Union Village, and under the latter name was platted in 1837. A post office was established at Providence in 1880, and remained in operation until it was discontinued in 1908.

Geography

References 

Unincorporated communities in Johnson County, Indiana
Unincorporated communities in Indiana
Indianapolis metropolitan area